The Exchange Place station is a station on the Port Authority Trans–Hudson (PATH) rail system in the Paulus Hook neighborhood of Jersey City, Hudson County, New Jersey. The station is on the Newark–World Trade Center line between Newark Penn Station and World Trade Center all week and the Hoboken–World Trade Center line during the day on weekdays to service Hoboken Terminal. Exchange Place provides access to the Jersey City waterfront and a station on the Hudson–Bergen Light Rail, where connections are available to Bayonne and North Bergen.

Exchange Place station opened on July 19, 1909 as part of the original opening of the Hudson and Manhattan Railroad between the former Pennsylvania Railroad terminal at Exchange Place and Hudson Terminal. The station headhouse was rebuilt in 1989. Exchange Place station flooded after the September 11 attacks and was closed until June 29, 2003, when it became a temporary terminal. Service returned to World Trade Center on November 23, 2003.

History

Original station
The original Exchange Place station opened on July 19, 1909 at the western end of the Downtown Hudson Tubes adjacent to the Pennsylvania Railroad station and ferry terminal. The aboveground entrance and platforms were refurbished in the late 1960s and early 1970s after the Port Authority of New York and New Jersey took over operations of the Hudson and Manhattan Railroad.

A derailment on April 26, 1942 at this station resulted in five deaths and over 200 injuries. In that incident, the train operator Louis Vierbucken was charged with manslaughter, as he was under the influence of liquor. Court records recount that he "began to go faster and faster, disregarding warning signals and curves" and then the train derailed at the station.

Present day
The present-day station entrance pavilion at Exchange Place was constructed at a cost of $66 million, and was dedicated on September 13, 1989. At this time, the surrounding Paulus Hook area was beginning to undergo revitalization with new office building construction. In April 1994, a new entrance to the Exchange Place station was opened, making the station ADA accessible. The new entrance was glass-enclosed and featured two elevators which led to a lower-level passageway  down, from where another elevator went down the short distance to platform level.

The Exchange Place station was closed as a result of the September 11, 2001 attacks, due to water damage. Before the attacks, the station served 16,000 passengers daily. The World Trade Center station was also crucial, as that station contained a loop that enabled trains to turn around and reverse direction. New trackwork was installed at a cost of $160 million, which included an interlocking to allow the trains to switch tracks, thus enabling trains to terminate at Exchange Place. While the station was closed, the eight-car-long station platforms were lengthened by two car lengths so they could accommodate 10-car trains. On June 29, 2003, the Exchange Place PATH station reopened, restoring services to Newark and Hoboken. On November 23, 2003, service was restored to the World Trade Center site with the reopening of the World Trade Center station.

In February 2006, the Transportation Security Administration (TSA) established a pilot project to test airport-style security screening at the Exchange Place station.

The PANYNJ later announced a resiliency project in which it planned to replace the glass revolving doors and windows that surround the turnstiles with a seven-foot-high concrete wall and aquarium glass several inches thick. The project would include in the installation of two Kevlar curtains.

In June 2019, the Port Authority released the PATH Improvement Plan. As part of the plan, two additional cross-corridors were to be added at Exchange Place. The construction of the cross-corridors was expected to be completed by 2022.

From January 2019 until June 2020, the Newark-World Trade Center route terminated at Exchange Place on almost all weekends for Sandy-related repairs, except on holiday weekends. The truncation was initially expected to last through all of 2020, but ended in June 2020, six months ahead of schedule.

Station layout

The station features three -long escalators that provide access to the platform level, located  beneath street level. Connections are available to the Hudson-Bergen Light Rail at street level.

West of the station (railroad north), there are five trackways, two outer tracks for Hoboken, two inner tracks for Newark and one stub-end track connecting each of the Newark tracks. East of the station (railroad south), both lines continue into their weekday terminus.

The station has two vestibules, each containing one side platform and one track for trains in a given direction. The platforms are connected through several corridors. There are switches within the platform at the far western end of the station, where the HOB-WTC line's tracks diverge. As a result, only NWK-WTC trains can serve the whole platform.

Nearby attractions
Nearby attractions include the Colgate Clock, Goldman Sachs Tower, Harborside Financial Center, Paulus Hook, and the Hudson and Manhattan Railroad Powerhouse.

References

External links
PATH - Exchange Place
1970s image of the former Exchange Place H&M Station with PATH Signage (Hudson Tubes Website)

PATH stations in New Jersey
Railway stations in Hudson County, New Jersey
Railway stations located underground in New Jersey
Transportation in Jersey City, New Jersey
1909 establishments in New Jersey
Railway stations in the United States opened in 1909